Tuzhal (also Romanized as Tūzhāl) is a village in Melkari Rural District, Vazineh District, Sardasht County, West Azerbaijan Province, Iran. At the 2006 census, its population was 243, in 46 families.

References 

Populated places in Sardasht County